Mi propósito eres tú is a Mexican television special short created by Televisa and broadcast on Las Estrellas. The first short was shown for the first time on 18 December 2018. The special at first, was created to make a Christmas campaign and closing of the New Year's Eve of 2018. The first short consisted to show a preview of the new telenovelas and series that Televisa would produce for 2019. Among the series that were shown in the short as new productions were: Ringo, This Is Silvia Pinal, Doña Flor y sus dos maridos, Como dice el dicho, Los elegidos (in the short as "Los protegidos"), La reina soy yo, Por amar sin ley, El Dragón: Return of a Warrior (as "El último dragón"), and No Fear of Truth: Awake. Despite not having been renewed for new seasons, some characters from series and telenovelas such as La Piloto, Mi marido tiene familia, Amar a muerte, and Like appeared in the special.

The special is presented by Mané de la Parra, who also appears singing the song "Mi propósito eres tú" during the special. Although the special was created with a unique motive, on 22 March 2019, Las Estrellas released another special, now turned into a parody to promote their new comedy series. In this second special the main theme is still "Mi próposito eres tú", now turned into parody as "Mi propósito es hacerte reír" and is interpreted in general by the entire cast of different series. Among the comedy series that appeared in the second short were: Vecinos, Simón dice, Una familia de diez, Alma de ángel, Lorenza, Mi lista de exes, Julia vs. Julia, Nosotros los guapos, Renta congelada, and Mi querida herencia (as "Hasta que la herencia nos separe").

On 16 December 2019, another special was released for the 2019–2020 season, where Televisa renewed some of its old programs for new seasons and included new productions such as Vencer el miedo, Te doy la vida, Médicos, Soltero con hijas, the third season of No Fear of Truth, the second season of ¿Quién es la máscara?.

Notable guest cast

Season 2018–2019 

 Mané de la Parra as himself / Juan José "Juanjo" Montés
 Silvia Pinal as herself
 Itatí Cantoral as Silvia Pinal / herself
 Sebastián Rulli as Miguel Garza
 Renata Notni as Adela Cruz
 Irina Baeva as Jimena Ortiz
 Zuria Vega as Julieta Aguilar Rivera
 Diana Bracho as Blanca Gómez de Córcega
 Daniel Arenas as Robert Cooper / Juan Pablo Córcega
 Arath de la Torre as Francisco "Pancho" López
 Gabriel Soto as Ernesto "Neto" Rey
 Livia Brito as Yolanda Cadena
 Sergio Corona as Don Tomás
 Ana Serradilla as María Florencia "Doña Flor" Méndez Canul
 Sergio Mur as Teodoro "Teo" Hidalgo Flores
 Mariluz Bermúdez as Samantha Cabrera de Mercader
 Joaquín Ferreira as Valentín Hernández "El Vale"
 Carlos Ferro as Mario Calderón / Mario García
 Macarena García as Sandra García García / María Asunción "Machu" Salas Oliver
 Álex Perea as Manuel "Manu" Montero
 Angelique Boyer as Lucía Borges
 Michel Brown as Macario Valdés
 Alexis Ayala as León Carvajal
 Alejandro Nones as Jonathan "Johnny" Corona
 Mariana Torres as Julia Garay
 César Évora as Óscar "Oso" Villar
 David Zepeda as Ricardo Bustamante
 Julián Gil as Carlos Ibarra
 Kimberly Dos Ramos as Sofía Alcocer
 Michelle Renaud as Yamelí Montoya
 Polo Morín as Erick Cruz Montoya
 Ale Müller as Emilia Ruiz Ayala
 Anna Iriyama as Keiko Kobayashi
 Santiago Achaga as Claudio Meyer
 Niurka Marcos as Alma
 Raúl Araiza as Paco

References

External links 
 

2018 television specials
2019 television specials
Mexican television specials
Las Estrellas original programming
Televisa original programming